Cyphalonotus is a genus of orb-weaver spiders first described by Eugène Simon in 1895.

Species
 it contains seven species:
Cyphalonotus assuliformis Simon, 1909 – Vietnam
Cyphalonotus benoiti Archer, 1965 – Congo
Cyphalonotus columnifer Simon, 1903 – Madagascar
Cyphalonotus elongatus Yin, Peng & Wang, 1994 – China
Cyphalonotus larvatus (Simon, 1881) – Congo, East Africa, Yemen (Socotra)
Cyphalonotus selangor Dzulhelmi, 2015 – Malaysia
Cyphalonotus sumatranus Simon, 1899 – Indonesia (Sumatra)

References

Araneidae
Araneomorphae genera
Spiders of Africa
Spiders of Asia
Taxa named by Eugène Simon